Ayoub Lakhal (born July 7, 1996) is a Moroccan footballer currently playing for Botola club SCC Mohammédia as a midfielder.

References

External links
Ayoub Lakhal at SofaScore.

1996 births
Living people
People from Tétouan
Moroccan footballers
Moghreb Tétouan players
Olympique Club de Khouribga players
Moghreb Tétouan
Association football midfielders